Botesbánya is the Hungarian name for three villages in Romania:

 Boteşti village, Câmpeni Town, Alba County
 Boteşti village, Zlatna Town, Alba County
 Boteşti village, Scărișoara Commune, Alba County